Fones is a surname. Notable people with the surname include:

Alfred Fones (1869–1938), American dentist 
Elizabeth Fones (1610– 1673), early American settler
Thomas Fones (died 1638), English merchant and politician
William Fones (1917–2010), American jurist

See also
Hones
Jones (surname)